The Empire of India Exhibition took place at Earls Court in London in 1895. Indian scenery was reproduced and there were displays which reflected the country's past and present states. The overall theme was that modern India was the product of British patience and genius. It was organised by Imre Kiralfy.

It featured the Great Wheel.

References

External links 
 
 Official catalogue.

Exhibitions in the United Kingdom
1895 in London
India–United Kingdom relations
Earls Court